The 1978 NCAA Division II Lacrosse Championship was the fifth annual single-elimination tournament to determine the national champions of NCAA Division II and Division III men's college lacrosse in the United States.

A separate Division III men's championship would not be introduced until 1980.

This year's final was played at Boswell Field at the Hobart College in Geneva, New York. 

Roanoke defeated two-time defending champion Hobart in the final, 14–13, to win their first national title. This was also Hobart's fifth consecutive appearance in the tournament's championship final. 

The Maroons (12–2) were coached by Paul Griffin.

Bracket

See also
NCAA Division I Men's Lacrosse Championship
NCAA Division III Men's Lacrosse Championship (from 1980)
NCAA Division II Women's Lacrosse Championship (from 2001)

References

NCAA Division II Men's Lacrosse Championship
NCAA Division II Men's Lacrosse Championship
NCAA Division I Men's Lacrosse